Dom Afonso de Santa Maria (born 25 March 1996) is the eldest son of Duarte Pio, Duke of Braganza, head of the House of Braganza. As heir-apparent to his father, Afonso is styled as Duke of Barcelos.

Early life
Afonso de Santa Maria Miguel Gabriel Rafael was born in Lisbon, the eldest child of Duarte Pio de Bragança, and Dª. Isabel Inês Castro Curvello de Herédia. His full name ends with Miguel Gabriel Rafael, a naming tradition of the House of Braganza that honors the three archangels in the Catholic Church.

On 1 June 1996, in the Cathedral of Braga, Afonso was baptised by Eurico Dias Nogueira, Archbishop of Braga, Primate of all the Spains.

His godparents are Princess Helene of Bourbon-Two Sicilies and his maternal uncle, Afonso Miguel de Herédia.

Immediately after his baptism at the Sé Cathedral of Braga, the young prince was consecrated in nearby Guimarães to Nossa Senhora da Oliveira, (Our Lady of the Olive Tree), where his ancestor King John I (founder of the House of Aviz), along with his illegitimate son Afonso, Duke of Braganza (founder of the House of Braganza), had been to thank her for his victory at the battle of Aljubarrota, in 1385, against his niece Queen Beatrice of Portugal and her husband John I of Castile.

Education 
Afonso's education has included St. Julian's School on the Portuguese Riviera, Colégio Planalto in Lisbon, and The Oratory School, a Catholic Public School in the United Kingdom.

He has a BA in Political Science and International Relations from the Catholic University of Portugal at the Institute for Political Studies in Lisbon.

Succession
Afonso is first in the line of succession to the Portuguese Crown, as heir to his father, the Duke of Braganza.

Public role
In August 2018 Afonso joined as an intern in the Social and Pre-Hospitalar Emergency Department, the Voluntary Fire Brigade of Lisbon, following in the foot steps of Afonso, Duke of Porto, who was Honorary Commander of the same brigade. The decision to join the fire brigade came after discussing Portugal's summer fires with his family and friends.

In recognition of his family's connections to Timor, Afonso was made an honorary Liurai in September 2014, when he and his family visited the country to attend the second Senate session of the Liurais Association, which represents the descendants of the island's tribal kings.

Honours
Foreign
  Knight Grand Cross of Honour and Devotion (Sovereign Military Order of Malta)
 Knight Grand Cross of the Order of the Holy Sepulchre (Holy See)

Dynastic
  Grand Cross of the Imperial Order of the Rose (Brazilian House of Orléans-Braganza)
 Knight Grand Cross of Justice of the Castroan-Two Sicilian Sacred Military Constantinian Order of Saint George (Castroan Royal Family of Two Sicilies)
 Grand-Cross of the Order of the Immaculate Conception of Vila Viçosa (Royal House of Portugal)

Ancestry

References

External links
 Official website of the Portuguese Royal Family

1996 births
Living people
House of Braganza
Portuguese infantes
Portuguese princes
Princes of Beira
Dukes of Portugal
Dukes of Barcelos
Portuguese Roman Catholics
People from Lisbon
People educated at The Oratory School
Knights of Malta
Knights of the Holy Sepulchre